Mohammad Fouad Abdulhamid (born 2 September 1989) is an Egyptian professional footballer born in Saudi Arabia who plays as a winger for Saudi Arabian club Jeddah.

References

External links
 

1989 births
Living people
Egyptian footballers
Egyptian expatriate footballers
Baladeyet El Mahalla SC players
Al Aluminium SC players
Al Batin FC players
Damac FC players
Al-Nahda Club (Saudi Arabia) players
Al-Ain FC (Saudi Arabia) players
Pharco FC players
Jeddah Club players
Egyptian Premier League players
Oman Professional League players
Saudi First Division League players
Saudi Professional League players
Expatriate footballers in Oman
Expatriate footballers in Saudi Arabia
Egyptian expatriate sportspeople in Saudi Arabia
Association football wingers